Tarpala is a village in Dera Baba Nanak in Gurdaspur district of the Indiant state of Punjab.

Geography 
The village is administrated by a Sarpanch, an elected representative of the village.

Education 
A school educates children.

Administration 
The sarpanch of this village is Gurmej Singh. The village has three gurudwaras and one Hindu temple.

Demographics 
, The village has 142 houses and a population of 770 including 418 males and 352 females.  147 people are from Schedule Castes but no Scheduled Tribes.

See also
List of villages in India

References

External links 
 Tourism of Punjab
 Census of Punjab

Villages in Gurdaspur district